Yi Li (born November 7, 1987, Changzhou) is a Chinese professional basketball player. He currently plays for the Jiangsu Dragons of the Chinese Basketball Association. He is also a member of the Chinese national basketball team.

He  played at the 2012 Summer Olympics.

References

1987 births
Living people
Basketball players at the 2012 Summer Olympics
Basketball players from Jiangsu
Chinese men's basketball players
Jiangsu Dragons players
Olympic basketball players of China
Small forwards
Sportspeople from Changzhou